Sahibzada Farhan (born 6 March 1996) is a Pakistani cricketer. He has played for several domestic teams since 2016 and in June 2018, he was called up to the national team for the first time. In August 2018, he was one of thirty-three players to be awarded a central contract for the 2018–19 season by the Pakistan Cricket Board (PCB).

Domestic career
He made his first-class debut for Peshawar in the 2016–17 Quaid-e-Azam Trophy on 1 October 2016. He plays for Islamabad United in the Pakistan Super League. He was the leading run-scorer for Balochistan in the 2017 Pakistan Cup, with 331 runs in five matches.

In April 2018, he was named in Punjab's squad for the 2018 Pakistan Cup. In the opening fixture of the tournament, against Balochistan, he scored 155 runs and was named the man of the match. In March 2019, he was named in Sindh's squad for the 2019 Pakistan Cup.

In September 2019, he was named in Khyber Pakhtunkhwa's squad for the 2019–20 Quaid-e-Azam Trophy tournament. In January 2021, he was named in Khyber Pakhtunkhwa's squad for the 2020–21 Pakistan Cup. He was the leading run-scorer in the 2021–22 National T20 Cup, with 447 runs. He was named the PCB's Domestic Cricketer of the Year for 2021.

International career
In June 2018, he was named in Pakistan's Twenty20 International (T20I) squad for the 2018 Zimbabwe Tri-Nation Series. He made his T20I debut against Australia in the final of the tournament.

In December 2018, he was named in Pakistan's team for the 2018 ACC Emerging Teams Asia Cup.

References

External links
 

1996 births
Living people
Pakistani cricketers
Pakistan Twenty20 International cricketers
Baluchistan cricketers
Peshawar cricketers
Islamabad United cricketers
Karachi Kings cricketers
People from Charsadda District, Pakistan